Bukidnon's at-large congressional district refers to the lone congressional district of the Philippines in the province of Bukidnon. It existed between 1935 and 1986 as either a single or plural member constituency for several national legislatures.

Bukidnon was first created as a subprovince of Agusan in 1907 from the territory of the Buquidnones that was previously unorganized spanning the Spanish politico-military districts of Misamis and Cotabato. It was admitted as a special province in 1914 under the direct control and jurisdiction of the Department of Mindanao and Sulu whose representatives to the national legislature were appointed by the Governor General as one at-large district beginning with the 4th Philippine Legislature in 1916. Following the passage of the Tydings–McDuffie Act in 1934, a delegate from the province was elected for the first time to the Philippine constitutional convention held in the same year. The province then began to send a representative to the Commonwealth National Assembly the following year from its single-member at-large district created under the 1935 constitution.

Bukidnon was also represented in the Second Republic National Assembly during the Pacific War. It returned to a single-member constituency for the restored House of Representatives in both the Commonwealth Congress and all seven meetings of the Third Philippine Republic Congress until 1972. The district was last contested at the 1984 Philippine parliamentary election and was eliminated following the 1987 apportionment under a new constitution.

Representation history

See also
Legislative districts of Bukidnon

References

Former congressional districts of the Philippines
Politics of Bukidnon
1935 establishments in the Philippines
1986 disestablishments in the Philippines
At-large congressional districts of the Philippines
Congressional districts of Northern Mindanao
Constituencies established in 1935
Constituencies disestablished in 1972
Constituencies established in 1984
Constituencies disestablished in 1986